Code (stylized as C O D E) is the eighth studio album by English electronic band Cabaret Voltaire, released in October 1987.

Two singles, "Don't Argue" and "Here to Go", were released from the album.

Content 

The lyrics and title of "Don't Argue" incorporate verbatim a number of sentences from the narration of the 1945 short film Your Job in Germany, directed by Frank Capra. The film was aimed at American soldiers occupying Germany and strongly warned against trusting or fraternizing with German citizens.

Reception 

AllMusic wrote that Code "finds Cabaret Voltaire at their loosest and most accessible", calling it "the closest thing CV ever made to a party record" and adding that it "[achieves] a genuine mechanistic funkiness reminiscent of late-'70s Kraftwerk". J.D. Considine, writing in Musician, contrasted Code with Kraftwerk's "elegant electronics," claiming that "Cabaret Voltaire processes sound the way a mainframe crunches numbers" before backing up to say: "cybernetic as the Cabs' sound may be, their sensibility is surprisingly pop."

Rolling Stone wrote that Code "finds the ideal balance between accessibility and menace", calling it "perhaps the duo's most exhilirating work".

Track listing
 "Don't Argue" – 4:26
 "Sex, Money, Freaks" – 4:57
 "Thank You America" – 5:22
 "Here to Go" – 5:09
 "Trouble (Won't Stop)" – 5:07
 "White Car" – 2:44
 "No One Here" – 5:00
 "Life Slips By" – 3:26
 "Code" – 4:07
 "Hey Hey" – 3:58 (bonus track on UK CD issue)
"Here to Go (Little Dub)" – 4:10 (bonus track on UK CD issue)

Personnel
Cabaret Voltaire
Stephen Mallinder – vocals, bass guitar, keyboards
Richard H. Kirk – guitars, keyboards, computer-generated instrumentation
with:
Bill Nelson – guitars on "Don't Argue", "Here to Go", "Trouble (Won't Stop)", "White Car" and "No One Here"
Mark Brydon – bass guitar on "Sex, Money, Freaks" and "No One Here"
Simeon Lister – saxophone on "Sex, Money, Freaks" and "No One Here"
Adrian Sherwood – production, also remixed a separately-released version of "Here to Go"

References

External links 

 

1987 albums
Cabaret Voltaire (band) albums
Albums produced by Adrian Sherwood
EMI Records albums